Washington County is a 1970 album by the American folk singer Arlo Guthrie. It peaked at #33 on the Billboard charts on December 4, 1970, and number 28 in Australia.

Critical reception
Contributing to Magnet, Bar/None owner Glenn Morrow called the album "remarkably eclectic". He praised "Gabriel's Mother's Highway Ballad #16 Blues", writing that it "wraps around the listener like a sonic temple—a place of peace and well-being, bracing out the cold winds of a hostile world".

Compilations and covers

"Gabriel's Mother's Hiway Ballad #16 Blues" was later included on the 1977 compilation The Best of Arlo Guthrie. A cover version of it became the title track of the 1972 Franciscus Henri album Gabriel's Mother's Highway.

Track listing
All tracks composed by Arlo Guthrie, except where indicated.

Side One
"Introduction" – 3:22
"Fencepost Blues" (sometimes rendered as "Fence Post Blues") – 3:11
"Gabriel's Mother's Hiway Ballad #16 Blues" – 6:23
"Washington County" – 1:59
"Valley to Pray" – 2:46 (Doc Coutson, John Pilla, Arlo Guthrie)

Side Two
"Lay Down Little Doggies" (Woody Guthrie) – 3:18
"I Could Be Singing" – 3:19
"If You Would Just Drop By" – 4:23
"Percy's Song" (Bob Dylan) – 4:57
"I Want to Be Around" – 2:45

Personnel
Arlo Guthrie – banjo, guitar, piano, autoharp, harp, vocals
Hoyt Axton – bass vocals
Ry Cooder – bottleneck guitar
Doug Dillard – banjo
Chris Ethridge – bass guitar
Richie Hayward – drums
John Pilla – guitar, autoharp, harmony vocals
Gary Walters – bass guitar
Clarence White – electric guitar
Technical
Barry Feldman – executive producer
Van Dyke Parks – co-producer on "Valley to Pray"

References

1970 albums
Arlo Guthrie albums
Albums produced by Lenny Waronker
Rising Son Records albums
E1 Music albums
Reprise Records albums